Chuen Yan Cheng is a Senior Scientist for the Population Council's Center for Biomedical Research. He is most well known as the inventor of the non-steroid male contraceptive drug——Adjudin, which is the first male contraceptive drug on the market now finished clinical trials showing no side effects.

Career
He graduated from the Chinese University of Hong Kong with a B.Sc. in 1977, and obtained his Ph.D. in biochemistry and cell biology at the University of Newcastle, Australia, in 1981. He came to New York as a Population Council post-doctoral trainee in 1981, studying in the laboratory of Drs. Wayne Bardin, Neal Musto, and Glen Gunsalus and was appointed as a research investigator in December 1982.

Cheng's research focuses on the development of a novel contraceptive for human males. These studies currently are supported by grants from the National Institutes of Health, the CONRAD Program, and the Andrew Mellon Foundation.

References

External links
Population Council

Living people
Rockefeller University faculty
Biochemistry educators
Alumni of the Chinese University of Hong Kong
1954 births
University of Newcastle (Australia) alumni